Jeffrey Norman Rouse (born February 6, 1970) is an American former competition swimmer, three-time Olympic champion, and former world record-holder in three events.

Rouse represented the United States in two consecutive Olympic Games in 1992 and 1996.  At the 1992 Summer Olympics in Barcelona, Spain, he won a gold medal swimming for the winning U.S. team in the men's 4×100-meter medley relay.  Individually, he also received a silver medal for his second-place performance in the men's 100-meter backstroke.

Four years later at the 1996 Summer Olympics in Atlanta, Georgia, he earned a gold medal as a member of the first-place U.S. team in the men's 4×100-meter medley relay.  In individual competition, he won another gold medal in the men's 100-meter backstroke.

Rouse is a member of the Virginia Sports Hall of Fame and the International Swimming Hall of Fame.

See also
 List of members of the International Swimming Hall of Fame
 List of multiple Olympic gold medalists
 List of Olympic medalists in swimming (men)
 List of Stanford University people
 List of World Aquatics Championships medalists in swimming (men)
 World record progression 50 metres backstroke
 World record progression 100 metres backstroke
 World record progression 4 × 100 metres medley relay

References

External links
 
 

1970 births
Living people
American male backstroke swimmers
World record setters in swimming
Olympic gold medalists for the United States in swimming
Olympic silver medalists for the United States in swimming
Sportspeople from Fredericksburg, Virginia
Stanford Cardinal men's swimmers
Swimmers at the 1992 Summer Olympics
Swimmers at the 1995 Pan American Games
Swimmers at the 1996 Summer Olympics
World Aquatics Championships medalists in swimming
Medalists at the 1996 Summer Olympics
Medalists at the 1992 Summer Olympics
Pan American Games gold medalists for the United States
Pan American Games medalists in swimming
Medalists at the 1995 Pan American Games
20th-century American people
21st-century American people